Decade of the Brain is the second studio album by DIN, released on January 5, 1994 by DOVe.

Reception
Aiding & Abetting wrote a mixed to negative review of Decade of the Brain, saying "there is a pleasant texture to the music, and you'll never get to the center of it."

Track listing

Personnel
Adapted from the Decade of the Brain liner notes.

DIN
 Jean-Claude Cutz (as Din and Pupka Frey) – vocoder, production

Additional performers
 David Newfeld – acoustic guitar, production

Production and design
 Gérard Bélanger – executive-producer
 Heiki Sillaste – cover art, illustrations, design
 Monika Szwyrlo – photography

Release history

References

External links 
 
 Decade of the Brain at iTunes

1994 albums
DIN (musician) albums
Cleopatra Records albums